François-Louis or François Louis may refer to:
François Louis, Prince of Conti (1664–1709), French nobleman
François Louis, Count of Harcourt (1623–1694) French nobleman
François Louis, inventor of the aulochrome, a musical instrument

People with the given name
François Louis Bourdon (1758–1797), French politician
François-Louis Cailler (1796–1852), first Swiss producer of chocolate
François-Louis de Pourroy de Lauberivière (1711–1740), fifth bishop of the diocese of Quebec
François Louis de Rousselet, Marquis de Châteaurenault (1637–1716), French vice-admiral, maréchal, and governor of Brittany
François-Louis Français (1814–1897), French painter
François-Louis Ganshof (1895–1980), Belgian medievalist
François-Louis Laporte, comte de Castelnau (1810–1880), French naturalist
François-Louis Lessard (1860–1927), Canadian general
François-Louis Perne (1772–1832), French composer and musicographer
François-Louis Tremblay (born 1980), Canadian Olympic gold medalist in speed skating

See also
Louis-François (disambiguation)